Premier of China  may refer to:

 Premier of the People's Republic of China, head of government of China
 Li Qiang, Chinese premier who succeeded Li Keqiang in 2023
 Premier of the Republic of China
 Chen Chien-jen, premier of Taiwan (ROC) since 2023
 Yikuang, China’s first premier (prime minister)

See also
 List of premiers of China
 Prime Minister of China (disambiguation)
 Grand chancellor (China)